"Inconsolable" is a song by American boy band Backstreet Boys. The song was released as the first single from their sixth studio album Unbreakable (2007). It is the group's first single without Kevin Richardson, who had left the group in 2006. The single was released to US radio outlets on August 27, 2007. It was first confirmed on July 25, 2007, and premiered by Jive at Z-100 - New York's Hit Music Station on August 6. The song entered the top ten in seven countries, reaching the number-two spot of the Italian Top Singles Chart.

Background and composition
"Inconsolable" was written by Emmanuel Kiriakou, Lindy Robbins and Jess Cates and produced by Emanuel Kiriakou. It features the trademark emotional boy band romantic lyrics with heartfelt vocals.

The song is a piano-driven power ballad similar to "Incomplete". It features acoustic piano, strings, rhythmic acoustic guitars, heavy vocal harmonies and an emotional vocal performance. The song's verses are in the key of G major, whilst the chorus is in the relative key of E minor.

Critical reception
The song was well received by critics. Bill Lamb of About.com wrote: "It only takes one cut like the first single 'Inconsolable' to realize the group is concentrating on fleshing out their most comfortable pop territory." Andy Battaglia of The A.V. Club commented that the song "reach the stirring heights of old while maintaining Backstreet Boys' habit of mimicking, melodically and structurally, songs by Def Leppard." Gemma Padley of BBC Music wrote that the song "features the trademark emotional wrangling but thankfully resists boy band cliches like the diabolical key change." Simon Vozick-Levinson from Entertainment Weekly called it a "soggy adult-contemporary power ballad", while Matt O'Leary from Virgin Media named it "a textbook Backstreet Boys song, a huge, glossy, shiny thing, with very heartfelt vocals." Yahoo! Music wrote: "It is an extremely catchy pop song, a perfect track to reintroduce the group to the marketplace."

Music video
The music video, directed by Ray Kay, was shot in Venice Beach, California on August 16, 2007. The music video features the group both individually and together. In the beginning, Nick Carter is shown lying on the beach during a solar eclipse, Brian Littrell is in a house looking out, AJ McLean is on the street with a car, much like in "Incomplete", and Howie Dorough is shown sitting with his back against a wall near the beach. At various intervals in between, when the chorus is sung, the four are seen together on the Venice Pier. After the leads are sung, the scenes shift between the group individually and together; at the end of the video, the eclipse ends. The city wakes up and they walk towards the ocean together on the pier.

Track listings
UK CD1
 "Inconsolable" – 3:36
 "Close My Eyes" – 4:06

UK CD2
 "Inconsolable" (album version) – 3:36
 "Inconsolable" (Jason Nevins remix) – 4:14
 "Inconsolable" (Soul Seekerz remix) – 5:49
 "Inconsolable" (Eazy remix) – 6:08
 "Inconsolable" (video enhancement) – 3:43

Australian and Japanese CD single
 "Inconsolable" (main version) – 3:36
 "Inconsolable" (instrumental) – 3:36

Charts

Weekly charts

Year-end charts

Certifications

Release history

References

External links
 Preview @ BackstreetBoys.com 
 Billboard

2000s ballads
2007 singles
2007 songs
Backstreet Boys songs
Jive Records singles
Music videos directed by Ray Kay
Pop ballads
Songs written by Emanuel Kiriakou
Songs written by Jess Cates
Songs written by Lindy Robbins